Bernard M. Oliver (May 17, 1916 – November 23, 1995), also known as Barney Oliver, was a scientist who made contributions in many fields, including radar, television, and computers.  He was the founder and director of Hewlett Packard (HP) laboratories until his retirement in 1981. He is also a recognized pioneer in the search for extraterrestrial intelligence (SETI). Oliver was president of the Institute of Electrical and Electronics Engineers in 1965. In 1986, Oliver was a National Medal of Science recipient for Engineering Science and on February 11, 2004 it was announced that Oliver had been inducted into the National Inventors Hall of Fame.

Oliver was elected to the National Academy of Sciences in 1973, received the National Medal of Science in 1986, and was inducted into the National Inventors Hall of Fame in 2004. The asteroid (2177) Oliver is named after him.

Early years
Worked at Bell Labs.

HP Labs 
Founded HP Labs and worked there four decades.

Scientific contributions
 Developed pulse-code modulation (PCM) with John R. Pierce and Claude Shannon
 Headed the HP calculators development team

Chairs, foundations, and awards
 In 2004 he was inducted into The National Inventors Hall of Fame.
 In 1997 the SETI Institute established a newly endowed position, the Bernard M. Oliver Chair.  
 Bernard Oliver Memorial Fund
 National Medal of Science, List of National Medal of Science winners, Engineering 1986
 Oliver Observing Station, observatory of the Monterey Institute for Research in Astronomy
 IEEE Lamme Medal (1977)

See also
 2177 Oliver (an asteroid named for Bernard M. Oliver)
 SETI

References

External links
HP news release
 Oliver, Bernard M., 1916-. (1986). Oral history interview with Bernard More Oliver. Charles Babbage Institute. Retrieved from the University of Minnesota Digital Conservancy, http://hdl.handle.net/11299/107590.
SETI Institute biography
Bernard Oliver Memorial Fund

American computer scientists
20th-century American engineers
1916 births
1995 deaths
National Medal of Science laureates
Hewlett-Packard people
Scientists at Bell Labs
IEEE Lamme Medal recipients
20th-century American inventors
Silicon Valley people
American electrical engineers